The following is a list of clubs who played in the Yorkshire Football League.

The league ran at first from 1897/98 to 1898/99, and then from 1920/21 to 1981/82.

1st Yorkshire League (1897/98 – 1899/1900)

 Barnsley St. Peters (reserves only)
 Bradford
 Dewsbury
 Doncaster Rovers (reserves only)
 Featherstone
 Halifax
 Huddersfield
 Hunslet
 Leeds
 Mexborough
 Ossett
 Sheffield
 Sheffield United (reserves only)
 The Wednesday (reserves only)
 Wombwell Town

2nd Yorkshire League (1920/21 – 1981/82)

 Acomb
 Altofts West Riding Colliery
 Barnoldswick Town
 Barnsley ('A' team only)
 Barton Town
 Beighton Miners Welfare
 Bentley Victoria Welfare
 Blackburn Welfare
 Bolsover Colliery
 Bradley Rangers
 Bradford City (reserves & 'A' team only)
 Bradford Park Avenue (reserves & 'A' team only)
 Bradford United
 Bridlington Town
 Bridlington Trinity
 Briggs Sports
 British Ropes
 Brodsworth Welfare
 Brook Sports
 Bullcroft Main Colliery
 Castleford & Allerton United
 Castleford Town (first team & reserves)
 Chesterfield ('A' team only)
 Collingham
 Denaby United
 Dewsbury & Savile
 Dinnington Athletic
 Dodworth Miners Welfare
 Doncaster Rovers (reserves & 'A' team only)
 Doncaster United
 Dunscroft Welfare
 East End Park WMC (first team and reserves)
 East Riding Amateurs
 Emley
 Farsley Celtic (first team & reserves)
 Firbeck Main Colliery
 Firth Vickers
 Frecheville Community
 Frickley Colliery (first team & reserves)
 Fryston Colliery Welfare
 Gainsborough Trinity (first team & reserves)
 Garforth Miners
 Goole Town (first team & reserves)
 Grimethorpe Miners Welfare
 Guiseley
 Halifax Town (reserves & 'A' team only)
 Hallam
 Hall Road Rangers
 Hamptons Sports
 Harrogate
 Harrogate Railway Athletic (first team & reserves)
 Harrogate Town (first team & reserves)
 Harworth Colliery Institute
 Hatfield Main
 Heeley Amateurs
 Hook Shipyards
 Houghton Main
 Huddersfield Town ('A' team only)
 Hull Amateurs
 Hull Brunswick
 Hull City ('A' team only)
 International Harvesters
 Keighley Central
 Keighley Town
 Kiveton Park
 Leeds Ashley Road
 Leeds & Carnegie College
 Leeds City
 Leeds Harehills
 Leeds United ('A' team only)
 Lincoln United
 Liversedge
 Maltby Main
 Methley Perseverance
 Mexborough Town (first team & reserves)
 Micklefield Welfare
 Monckton Athletic
 North Ferriby United
 Norton Woodseats
 Ollerton Colliery (first team & reserves)
 Ossett Albion (first team & reserves)
 Ossett Town (first team & reserves)
 BSC Parkgate
 Phoenix Park
 Pickering Town
 Pilkington Recreation
 Pontefract Borough
 Pontefract Collieries
 Rawmarsh Welfare
 Redfearn National Glass
 Retford Town (first team & reserves)
 Rossington Miners Welfare
 Rotherham United ('A' team only)
 Rothwell Athletic
 Rowntrees
 Salts (Saltaire) (first team & reserves)
 Scarborough (reserves only)
 Scarborough Penguins
 Scunthorpe United (reserves only)
 Selby Olympia Cake & Oil
 Selby Town
 Sheffield
 Sheffield Polytechnic
 Sheffield United ('A' team only)
 Sheffield University
 Sheffield Wednesday ('A' team only)
 Slazengers
 South Kirkby Colliery
 St. John College (York)
 Stocksbridge Works
 Swallownest Miners Welfare
 Swillington Miners Welfare
 Tadcaster Albion
 Thackley
 Thorne Colliery
 Upton Colliery
 Wakefield City (first team & reserves)
 Wath Athletic (first team & reserves)
 Winterton Rangers
 Wombwell (first team & reserves)
 Wombwell Sports Association
 Woolley Miners Welfare
 Worksop Town (first team & reserves)
 Worsbrough Bridge Miners Welfare
 York City (reserves & 'A' team only)
 York Railway Institute
 Yorkshire Amateur (first team & reserves)
 Yorkshire Water Authority (Southern)
 York YMCA

References

Yorkshire League Football Clubs